Lieutenant Harold Byrn Hudson MC (8 December 1898 – February 1982) was a Canadian First World War flying ace, officially credited with 13 victories. As wingman to William George Barker, he scored a record five victories over observation balloons in a single day.

Biography
Hudson was British-born, but his family relocated to British Columbia in 1912. He joined the Royal Flying Corps, being commissioned a Probationary Temporary Second Lieutenant on 24 May 1917. He was assigned to 28 Squadron in Italy. There Hudson often flew with Captain William George Barker. Indeed, Hudson's first victories were two observation balloons shared with Barker on 24 January 1918. Hudson went on to destroy an Albatros D.V on 5 February. Then, a week later, Barker and Hudson pulled off the unprecedented feat of destroying five kite balloons on a single sortie. By 26 May 1918, Hudson's win total reached seven balloons and six airplanes; besides the mass victories over balloons with Barker, Hudson had destroyed four airplanes and driven two down out of control. He was posted briefly, without success, to 45 Squadron.

Postwar, Hudson returned to Canada to work in pulp mills making paper.

Honours and awards
16 September 1918 – T./Lt. Harold Byrn Hudson, R.A.F. is awarded the Military Cross:

Notes

References

Christopher F. Shores, Norman L. R. Franks, Russell Guest Above the Trenches: A Complete Record of the Fighter Aces and Units of the British Empire Air Forces 1915-1920. Grub Street, 1990. , .

Canadian World War I flying aces
Canadian recipients of the Military Cross
Royal Air Force officers
1898 births
1982 deaths
People from Cobham, Surrey
English emigrants to Canada
British aviation record holders